The communauté de communes Les Trois Provinces was created on December 26, 2000 and is located in the Cher  département  of the Centre-Val de Loire  region of France. Its seat is in Sancoins. Its area is 269.6 km2, and its population was 5,146 in 2018.

Composition
The communauté de communes consists of the following 11 communes:

Augy-sur-Aubois
Chaumont
Givardon
Grossouvre
Mornay-sur-Allier
Neuilly-en-Dun
Neuvy-le-Barrois
Sagonne
Saint-Aignan-des-Noyers
Sancoins
Vereaux

References

Trois Provinces
Trois Provinces